Luka Yovetich (born August 18, 1975), known professionally as Luka Jones, is an American actor and comedian, best known for co-starring in the NBC sitcoms Best Friends Forever and Up All Night.

Early life and education
Jones was born in Evanston, Illinois and raised in the Chicago and Denver metro areas. He graduated from the University of Kansas. He later earned his master's degree in philosophy from California State University, Los Angeles and his doctorate in philosophy from the University of Southern California. Jones studied acting at the Atlantic Theater Company in New York City and the Steppenwolf Theatre Company in Chicago. He studied improv and has been a regular performer at both I.O. West and the Upright Citizens Brigade Theater in Los Angeles.

Career 
In 2012, Jones co-starred as Joe, one of the lead characters on the short-lived NBC comedy series Best Friends Forever, alongside Jessica St. Clair and Lennon Parham. Afterwards he joined the cast of NBC's Up All Night as a series regular in its second season, playing the role of Scott, Reagan's (Christina Applegate) younger brother.

Jones joined the ensemble cast of People of Earth in 2016 as Gerry Johnson, "an amiable social dropout, tollbooth worker and enthusiastic expert on all things alien".

Filmography

Film

Television

References

External links
 

1975 births
Living people
American male comedians
American male television actors
American stand-up comedians
Male actors from Colorado
Male actors from Chicago
University of Kansas alumni
California State University, Los Angeles alumni
University of Southern California alumni
21st-century American male actors
American male film actors
Comedians from Illinois
Upright Citizens Brigade Theater performers
21st-century American comedians